Jean-Claude Amiot  (born 18 October 1939 in Vichy) is a French composer, music professor and conductor.

Amiot studied at Music conservatory in Le Mans as a violinist, later taking piano lessons. From 1955 he studied in Lyon with César Geoffray. From 1963 he attended the Scola Cantorum in Paris under Edmond Pendelton.

In 1964 Amiot moved to New York City where he worked with Dimitris Mitropoulos, Leonard Bernstein and Leopold Stokowski who encouraged him to pursue his career in music.

On returning to France in 1968, Amiot became director of the Mâcon branch of the Ecole Nationale de Musique, and, from 1983, director of the Conservatoire national de région of Clermont-Ferrand, a post held until his retirement in 2000.

Works
Amiot has written over a hundred works, including those noted below. Other notable compositions include the choral symphony 1789, pour la Révolution (1989), performed before an audience of 80000 at the peak of the Puy-de-Dôme.

Orchestral
Mon premier concert (1979)
Sun is working in the Sky (1981)
Caraïbes, caraïbes (1985)

Brass orchestra
Messager des etoiles
Mon troisième concert
Vaudou

Opera
Voleur de lune, opera in 3 acts
Messager des etoiles fresque lyrique d'après la vie de Galilée (version nouvelle 2009)

Chamber music
Melpomene for Violoncello and Clavier

External links
 Biographical note at the Centre de documentation de la musique contemporaine

People from Vichy
1939 births
Living people
French male conductors (music)
French opera composers
Male opera composers
French male classical composers
21st-century French conductors (music)
21st-century French male musicians
Occitan musicians